Yüsup Eysa (born July 1939) is a Chinese politician of Uyghur ethnicity who served as mayor of Ürümqi, vice chairman of Xinjiang Uygur Autonomous Region, and vice chairman of the Xinjiang Regional Committee of the Chinese People's Political Consultative Conference. He was a delegate to the 7th National People's Congress.

Biography
Yüsup Eysa was born in Shanshan County, Xinjiang, July 1939. He entered the workforce in October 1955, and joined the Chinese Communist Party in December 1958. He served as deputy party secretary of Turpan before being promoted to mayor of Ürümqi in 1987 and then vice chairman of Xinjiang Uygur Autonomous Region. In January 1998, he was proposed as vice chairman of the Xinjiang Regional Committee of the Chinese People's Political Consultative Conference, the region's top political advisory body.

References

1939 births
Living people
People from Shanshan County
Uyghur politicians
People's Republic of China politicians from Xinjiang
Chinese Communist Party politicians from Xinjiang
Mayors of Ürümqi
Delegates to the 7th National People's Congress